Dennis Schmidt was an American science fiction and fantasy author who published from 1978 to 1990. He published his ten novels in three series. He was known for incorporating elements of Zen philosophy and martial arts into space opera and fantasy plots.

Publications
Kensho (series): A series of martial arts stories taking place on a distant world.

 Way-Farer, Ace Books, 1978
 Kensho, Ace Books, 1979
 Satori, Ace Books, 1981
 Wanderer, Ace Science Fiction Books, 1985

Twilight of the Gods (trilogy): A series of fantasy novels.

 The First Name, 1985
 Groa's Other Eye, 1986
 Three Trumps Sounding, 1987

The Questioner Trilogy

 Labyrinth, 1989
 City of Crystal Shadow, 1990
 Dark Paradise, 1990

References

External links

American fantasy writers
American male novelists
American science fiction writers
20th-century American novelists
1939 births
2003 deaths
20th-century American male writers